Microdiores is a genus of spiders in the family Zodariidae. It was first described in 1987 by Jocqué. , it contains 4 African species.

References

Zodariidae
Araneomorphae genera
Spiders of Africa